Waterloo North was a provincial electoral district represented in the Legislative Assembly of Ontario from Confederation in 1867 until 1999.

It was abolished in 1999 when provincial ridings were defined to have the same borders as federal ridings, and most of its area was incorporated into the riding of Kitchener—Waterloo.

Members of Provincial Parliament

Results

See also 
Waterloo North, federal riding which existed 1867-1968

External links 
1995 election results, Elections Ontario

Former provincial electoral districts of Ontario